Ashtishat (Aštišat; Western Armenian: Ashdishad) is a locality and archaeological site in Muş Province of eastern Turkey. It is located near the village of Yücetepe, Muş at 38° 58' 20"N and 41° 27' 04" E on the Murat river east of Lake Van and north of the city of Muş.

In antiquity the village was an important site of early Armenian Christianity and the ruins of several ancient church's and the monastery of Saint Daniel of Gop still occupy the town. The site also hosts the tombs of several early saints and patriotic leaders of the ancient Armenian kingdom.

History
According to Armenian tradition, Ashtishat was the site of an ancient Greek temple. In the 4th century, Saint Gregory the Illuminator founded a church here.In 364, Gregory's great-grandson Saint Narses, convened the Council of Ashtishat which established cannon, liturgy,  fast days and procedures for classical Armenian Christianity.
 
Nerses son, St. Sahag chamberlain to  King Arshak II, founded a monastery in Ashtishat.

Ashtishat was destroyed during the Arab invasion and again by Tamerlane.

See also
 -shat (suffix)

References 

Populated places in Muş Province
Archaeological sites in Turkey
Ancient Armenia